1921 is a 2021 Chinese historical film directed by Huang Jianxin and Zheng Dasheng and starring Huang Xuan, Ni Ni, Wang Renjun and Liu Haoran. The film tells the story of the founding of the Chinese Communist Party at the 1st National Congress of the Chinese Communist Party held in Shanghai. The film premiered in China on 1 July 2021, to commemorate the centennial year anniversary of the Chinese Communist Party.

Cast

Production 
Shooting began on 1 July 2020 and took place in Shanghai and finished filming on November 5 of that same year. Zheng Shuang, who played Xiang Jingyu, was removed from the film for surrogacy scandal; Yan Xujia's role was removed after rumors Yan had cheated on his girlfriend.

Music

Release 
1921 released on 1 July 2021 in China.

Box office
According to the China Movie Data Information Network, the film took 81.60 million yuan ($12.6 million) on its opening day, and 44.2 million yuan the next day. The film earned a total of 300 million yuan ($46.32 million) in its first four days of release.

Accolades

References

External links 
 
 

2021 films
2020s Mandarin-language films
Chinese historical films
Films shot in Shanghai
Films set in Shanghai
Tencent Pictures films